Town Centre Private Schools (TCPS) is a private, co-educational, IB world school in Markham, Ontario founded in 1986. Students from preschool to grade 12 are accepted. There are three campuses, all in Markham, Ontario. The Amarillo Campus teaches students from 18 months to 6 years old, Main Campus, which teaches Grades 2–12, and Milliken Campus, which teaches ESL Grades 9–12.

Subjects Taught
The core subjects of English, Mathematics, Science, History and Geography are taught to students in grades one through six by their regular classroom teachers. Students in grades six, seven and eight (Grade six rotary teaching schedule added in the year 2019) have a rotary teaching schedule, with specialist teachers in Mathematics, Language, Science, History and Geography. Students in grades one through eight have specialist teachers for Computer Studies, Physical Education, French and Music/Band.

Extended Hours
After school programs are offered, including but not limited to, choir, badminton, ballet, hip hop, pottery, art, computer club, tae-kwon-do, Robotics, 3D printing, chess and piano.

Summer Programs

From July to August summer programs are offered. A summer camp as well as a French camp (added in 2019) are offered in the summer. The activities in these programs include field trips, sports, and other activities. Swimming is available once weekly.

References

External links

Private schools in Ontario
Montessori schools in Canada